Professor Bernhardi (1912) is one of the best known plays written by the Viennese dramatist, short story writer and novelist Arthur Schnitzler.  It was first performed in Berlin at the Kleines Theater in 1912, but banned in Austria until the collapse of the Austro-Hungarian Empire as a result of World War I. Though billed as a 'comedy in five acts', the play explores antisemitism and Austrian-Jewish identity.

Plot
The setting is Vienna, 1900. Professor Bernhardi is a Jewish physician, director of the Elisabethinum, a clinic named in honor of Empress Elisabeth of Austria.  A young woman in his care is dying of sepsis following an abortion. Unaware that she is on the brink of death, she is happy and believes herself to be recovering. Father Reder, a priest summoned by a nurse arrives to give the patient the last rites but Bernhardi refuses him admission. He wants to spare her the anguish she would suffer were she to realize that she is about to die. The priest argues that she must be absolved of sin before she dies, especially since she has undergone an abortion. While Bernhardi and Father Reder are arguing, the girl dies, having been told by the nurse that the priest arrived. Her death was hastened by having realized that her condition was terminal and she died in a state of fear.

A press campaign causes public outcry. False testimony and fabrications about Bernhardi striking the priest inflame the endemic antisemitism. Bernhardi faces trial. Professor Ebenwald, a man with influence among corrupt judicial officers offers to pay a bribe so that Bernhardi can avoid trial. He will do this on condition that Bernhardi agrees to instate a Christian physician rather than Dr. Wenger, a Jewish physician Bernhardi had wanted to appoint based on merit. Bernhardi refuses Ebenwald's suggestion.

Bernhardi is visited by Father Reder. Reder admits that Bernhardi acted properly and in accordance with his duty as the patient's physician. Bernhardi asks why Reder did not say as much during the legal proceedings. He answers that he could not because that would have been to acknowledge that Bernhardi had more right to send him away than he had right to administer the last rites. He claims that he stayed silent because of divine inspiration which compelled him to protect the church. When Bernhardi questions him about this, he accuses Bernhardi of refusing admission to the patient because of hostility towards the Catholic Church. The verdict of the trial is given. Bernhardi loses his post in the clinic he helped to found, is sentenced to two months in prison and loses his license to practice medicine. He refuses to appeal the decision.

The play ends with a philosophical discussion of the case between Bernhardi and a friend, Winkler, following Bernhardi's release.

Characters
 Professor Bernhardi, professor for internal medicine and director of the Elizabethinum
 Franz Reder, priest of the Church of Holy Florian
 Sister Ludmilla, a nurse
 Professor Ebenwald, professor of surgery, vice-director of the Elizabethinum
 Professor Flint, minister of culture and education, professor of surgery and childhood friend of Bernhardi, later his opponent
 Oskar Bernhardi, Professor Bernhardi's son and his assistant
 Doctor Goldenthal, attorney-at-law
 Kulka, a reporter
 Winkler, Bernhardi's friend

Adaptations
In 2019, the play was reimagined as The Doctor by writer and director Robert Icke. The Doctor premiered at the Almeida Theatre on August 10, 2019. The production was planned to transfer to London’s West End, but was postponed due to the coronavirus pandemic.

References

https://archive.org/stream/cu31924026341630#page/n85/mode/2up Professor Bernhardi by Arthur Schnitzler
Oxford Companion to German Literature, ed Henry and Mary Garland, Oxford University Press (1987) 
Guardian review  by Liz Hoggard of the Oxford Stage Company revival at the Arcola Theatre, London, March 2005 
The Stage review by John Thaxter of the Oxford Stage Company revival at the Arcola Theatre, London, March 2005

Plays by Arthur Schnitzler
1912 plays
Antisemitism in Austria
Bernhardi